Juan Andrés, Latinized Joannes Andreas (active 1487–1515), is the name chosen by a Spanish Muslim scholar who converted to Catholicism and wrote a well known polemical work against Islam, the Confusión o confutación de la secta mahomética y del Alcorán.

Life 
The man subsequently known as Juan Andrés was born in Xàtiva, Spain, the son of an Islamic scholar. Trained as a faqīh himself, he converted to Catholicism in 1487 and was baptised in Valencia Cathedral, taking the Christian name Juan Andrés. Becoming a priest, he was made an envoy by the Catholic Monarchs Ferdinand and Isabella, to preach Christianity in Granada after it was reconquered. He worked closely with the Aragonese Inquisitor Martín García.

Around 1516 there was a canon of Granada Cathedral by the name Juan Andrés, but it is not certain that this was the same man.

Works 
Juan Andrés' main apologetical work, Confusion de la secta mahomatica y del alcoran (Valencia, 1515), while written to encourage Muslims to convert to Christianity, was later banned by the Spanish Inquisition due to the extensive quotations from the Qur'an that it contained. It nevertheless went into many further editions.

The Confusion de la secta mahomatica was translated into Italian as Opera chiamata confusione della setta Machumetana (Venice, 1537; reprinted 1540, 1545, 1597), then from Italian into French as Confusion de la secte de Muhamed (Paris, 1574) and into Latin as Confusio sectae Mahometanae (Leipzig, 1595). It was translated from Spanish into Dutch as Een zeer wonderlycke ende waerachtighe historie van Mahomet (Antwerp, 1580), and from Latin into German as Confusio Sectae Mahometanae: darinnen deß Mahomets Ursprung, Ankunfft, Leben vnd Tod (Leipzig, 1598). An English translation bore the title The Confusion of Muhamed's Sect (London, 1652)

A second book has also been attributed to him, Sumario breve de la pratica de la arithmetica (Valencia, 1515), but with some doubt as to whether this is the same Juan Andrés.

References 

Writers from the Valencian Community
Former Muslim critics of Islam
16th-century Spanish writers
16th-century male writers
Converts to Roman Catholicism from Islam
Spanish former Muslims
Spanish Roman Catholic priests
People from Xàtiva